The 2008 United States House of Representatives elections in New Hampshire were held on November 4, 2008 to determine who would represent the state of New Hampshire in the United States House of Representatives during the 111th Congress from January 3, 2009 until January 3, 2011.  Both seats were held by Democratic incumbents before the election, which coincided with the 2008 presidential election, as well as the state's senatorial and gubernatorial elections.

The primary election was held on September 9, 2008.  Republicans selected Former Representative Jeb Bradley and newspaper columnist and radio show host Jennifer Horn to challenge incumbent Representatives Carol Shea-Porter and Paul Hodes.  Although CQ Politics had forecast the First Congressional District to be at risk for a change of party control, both incumbents were re-elected.

Match-up summary

Overview

District 1

 
This district covers the southeastern and eastern portions of New Hampshire, consisting of three general areas: Greater Manchester, the Seacoast and the Lakes Region. It includes all of Carroll and Strafford counties, almost all of Rockingham county, a small portion of Hillsborough County, and one town in Merrimack County.

Democratic incumbent Carol Shea-Porter defeated Republican nominee Jeb Bradley and Libertarian Robert Kingsbury. CQ Politics forecasted the race as 'No Clear Favorite'; The Rothenberg Political Report ranked the race as 'Pure Toss-Up'; and The Cook Political Report listed the race as a 'Democratic Toss-Up'.

Shea-Porter squeaked into Congress by a 51% to 49% margin against incumbent Republican Bradley in one of the greatest upsets of the 2006 election cycle. In January 2007, Bradley announced his intent to seek a rematch in 2008. He faced and defeated Former Assistant Attorney General and Department of Health and Human Services commissioner John Stephen in a close Republican primary. Shea-Porter did not face a primary challenge. George W. Bush narrowly won this district with 51% to 49% for John Kerry in 2004 (CPVI=R+0).

Republican Primary

 This includes 46 votes for incumbent Democratic Congresswoman Carol Shea-Porter.

General Election

Opinion Polling

The University of New Hampshire's Granite State Poll conducted in July found that incumbent Representative Carol Shea-Porter had a +3% net favorability rating in the district (35% favorable, 32% unfavorable, 9% neutral, and 24% did not know enough about her) while Former Representative Jeb Bradley had a net favorability rating of +21% (48% favorable, 27% unfavorable, 8% neutral, and 17% did not know enough about him).  The majority of Republicans supported Bradley, Democrats supported Shea-Porter, and Independents were leaning toward Bradley (40% to 26%).  Shea-Porter led among women  (46% to 36%) and Bradley led among men (56% to 34%).

In September, the fall Granite State Poll found that Shea-Porter's net favorability had increased to +13% (44% favorable, 31% unfavorable, 5% neutral, and 20% did not know enough about her), while Bradley's favorability has fallen to +7% (36% favorable, 29% unfavorable, 14% neutral, and 21% did not know enough about him).  The majority of Republicans supported Bradley, Democrats supported Shea-Porter, and Independents were leaning toward Bradley (44% to 38%). Shea-Porter continued to lead among women (50% to 39%) and Bradley maintained his lead among men (52% to 32%).

Current Candidate Websites
 Carol Shea-Porter (D) of Strafford - Incumbent (campaign website)
 Jeb Bradley (R) of Wolfeboro (campaign website)
 Bob Kingsbury (L) of Laconia (campaign website)

Former Candidate Websites
 John Stephen (R) of Manchester (campaign website)
 Geoff Michael (R) of Merrimack (campaign website)
 Dave Jarvis (R) of Hooksett (campaign website)
 Peter Bearse (I) of Fremont (campaign website)

District 2

 
This district consists of the western and northern portions of the state, including all of Cheshire, Coos, Grafton, and Sullivan counties as well as almost all of Merrimack and Hillsborough counties plus three towns in Rockingham county and two towns in Belknap County.

Democratic incumbent Paul Hodes defeated Republican nominee Jennifer Horn and Libertarian Chester L. Lapointe, II. CQ Politics forecasted the race as 'Democrat Favored'.

In 2006, Democrat Hodes upended Republican incumbent Charlie Bass with a 53% to 45% victory.  In 2008 Jennifer Horn, a radio talk show host, won the Republican primary against former Congressional Aide Grant Bosse, State Senator Bob Clegg, businessman Jim Steiner and Alfred L'Eplattenier.<ref>Brooks, Scott Horn tops 3 foes in Republican race New Hampshire Union Leader, September 10, 2008</ref>  John Kerry narrowly won the district with 52% of the vote in 2004 (CPVI=D+3).

Republican Primary

 97% of precincts reporting (9/10/08).

General Election

Current candidates
Paul Hodes (D) - Incumbent (campaign website)
Jennifer Horn (R) (campaign website)
Chester L. Lapointe, II (L) (campaign website)
Former candidates
Grant Bosse (R) (campaign website)
Robert Clegg, Jr. (R) (campaign website)
Jim Steiner (R) (campaign website)
Alfred L'Eplattenier (R) (campaign website)
Race ranking and details from CQ Politics
Campaign contributions from OpenSecrets

References

External links
Election Division from the New Hampshire Secretary of StateU.S. Congress candidates for New Hampshire at Project Vote Smart
New Hampshire U.S. House Races from 2008 Race TrackerCampaign contributions for New Hampshire congressional races from OpenSecretsDistrict 1 campaign contributions from OpenSecretsDistrict 2 campaign contributions from OpenSecretsPolitics from New Hampshire Union LeaderRace rankings
District 1 race ranking and details from CQ PoliticsDistrict 2 race ranking and details from CQ Politics2008 Competitive House Race Chart from The Cook Political Report2008 House Ratings from Rothenberg Political Report'', October 14, 2008

2008
New Hampshire
United States House of Representatives